2MASS J21265040−8140293, also known as 2MASS J2126−8140, is an exoplanet orbiting the red dwarf TYC 9486-927-1, 111.4 light-years away from Earth. Its estimated mass, age (10-45 million years), spectral type (L3), and Teff (1800 K) are similar to the well-studied planet β Pictoris b. With an estimated distance of around 1 trillion kilometres from its host star, it is one of the largest solar systems ever found.

References

J21265040−8140293
Exoplanets detected by direct imaging
Giant planets
Exoplanets discovered in 2009
Octans